Mary Katherine McSorley MBE is a former Irish nationalist politician.

McSorley joined the Social Democratic and Labour Party (SDLP), and was elected to Magherafelt District Council in 1981. She was then elected to the Northern Ireland Assembly in 1982, representing Mid Ulster.

In January 1989, McSorley accepted an MBE. This was against SDLP policy which stated that members should not accept British honours. It prompted talk of a split in the party, but McSorley was persuaded to resign. She held her council seat as an independent in 1989, but didn't stand for re-election in 1993.

References

Year of birth missing (living people)
Living people
Members of Magherafelt District Council
Members of the Order of the British Empire
Northern Ireland MPAs 1982–1986
Social Democratic and Labour Party politicians
Independent politicians in Northern Ireland
Female members of the Northern Ireland Assembly
Women councillors in Northern Ireland